License to Kill (German: "Lizenz zum Töten: Wie Israel seine Feinde liquidiert") is a 2013 German documentary film about Israel directed by Egmont R. Koch. The documentary offers interviews with lawyers, politicians and former Mossad agents.

Casts
 Arye Sharuz Shalicar
 Asa Kasher, former Mossad agent
 Moti Kfir, former Mossad agent
 Keshet Elion, former Mossad agent
 Gad Shimron, former Mossad agent
 Iftach Spector, general
 Philip Alston, professor
 Eliezer Tsafrir, former Mossad agent

External links

 Kurzbeschreibung des Films auf der Website von Das Erste (www.daserste.de)
 Kurzbeschreibung des Films für "tagesschau24".

German documentary films
Documentary films about Israel
Films about the Mossad
2010s German films